Heiko Gerber (born 11 July 1972) is a German former footballer who mainly played as a defender.

Club career 
He played more than 330 matches in the German top-flight and the second division.

International career 
Gerber represented Germany at the 1999 FIFA Confederations Cup.

Honours
VfB Stuttgart
 UEFA Intertoto Cup: 2000
 Bundesliga champion: 2006–07
 Bundesliga runner-up: 2002–03
 DFB-Pokal finalist: 2006–07
 DFB-Ligapokal finalist: 2005

References

External links
 
 
 
 

German footballers
Germany international footballers
1999 FIFA Confederations Cup players
Bundesliga players
2. Bundesliga players
Chemnitzer FC players
Arminia Bielefeld players
1. FC Nürnberg players
VfB Stuttgart players
FC Ingolstadt 04 players
SSV Ulm 1846 players
Association football defenders
Living people
1972 births